Jacob Katz  (Hebrew: יעקב כ"ץ) (born 15 November 1904 in Magyargencs, Hungary, died 20 May 1998 in Israel) was an internationally known Jewish historian and educator, recognized as "one of this century's greatest and most influential historians of the Jews." He established the history curriculum used in many of Israel's (National Religious) High Schools.

Katz described "traditional society" and deployed sociological methods in his study of Jewish communities, with special attention to changes in halakhah (Jewish law) and Orthodoxy. He pioneered the modern study of Orthodoxy and its formation in reaction to Reform Judaism.

In his youth he pursued both religious and secular studies, receiving rabbinic ordination and a doctorate in social history.

Early life
Professor Katz was born in 1904 in the small village of Magyargencs (Moyorganch) in western Hungary. The village was not large enough for a Jewish school, so he spent his first years of school at a Protestant school in a nearby village.

At the age of 12 he moved to study in a more distant town called Celldomolk. Afternoon hours were devoted to Jewish studies in the Talmud-Torah of the community. During this period he lived with a host family and returned home every few weeks for Sabbaths and holidays.

At age 16, the First World War led him to move to the city of Gyor where he studied at a yeshiva. From there he moved to study for about two years at the yeshiva in the Satoralya-Uihey community until he arrived in 1925 at the Yeshiva of Pressburg (Bratislava), the yeshiva founded by [Hatam Sofer] and which was headed by his descendants.

After about two and a half years of studying in this yeshiva, he felt a certain saturation in studying the Talmud and sought to also acquire a general education, reading literature such as the works of Friedrich Schiller, Theodore Herzl, and Ahad Ha'am.

In 1927 he wrote his first article for the Orthodox newspaper from Budapest - Zsido Ujsag, protesting a community judge who told Hungarian Jews stay away from Zionist or quasi-Zionist activities. The article was copied by the Zionist newspaper of Hungary, Zsido Szemle, who praised the rural Jew who showed a deeper understanding of the needs of the times than the leaders of Orthodoxy, and Katz was asked by the editor to continue writing articles. In Bratislava, Katz identified with the speeches of Rabbi Meir Berlin (Bar-Ilan), Nahum Sokolov And Ze'ev Jabotinsky, seeing the building of Israel as the primary task of the generation.

In the spring of 1928, he arrived in Frankfurt for the yeshiva "Adat Yeshuron", which at the time was headed by Yosef Breuer, one of the sons of the yeshiva's founder Shlomo Breuer. While studying there he also studied for and passed an entrance exam enabling him to study at the University of Frankfurt.

In the spring of 1934, he submitted his Doctoral Thesis on the subject of the assimilation of German Jews. For his livelihood he was engaged in giving private lessons in Judaism/Talmud to members of Rabbi Breuer's family and others and under these circumstances he met his future wife Gerti-Bina nee Birnbaum whom he married in Jerusalem in 1936. However, before immigrating to mandate Palestine, he spent a year in London to improve his English.

After immigrating to Palestine in 1936, he lived in Tel Aviv where he worked in occasional teaching jobs and later accepted a teaching position at the "Moriya" school. After that (1945-1950) he served as a teacher and director at the "Talfiot" teacher and kindergarten seminar.

Years 1945-1950
In the year 1945 Jacob Katz presented to a conference of historians his article "Marriage and Sexual Relations at the close of the Middle Ages" which was published that year in the periodical Zion. Katz, who lived at that time in Tel Aviv and worked as a lecturer at College of Education, had already been credited with a few articles in the fields of education, psychology, and pedagogy, and their publication had given him a good reputation in the field. However, this reputation alone did not make him happy; he even suspected that it might distance him from what he craved most of all: to get back to engagement in history research. It was Ben-Zion Dinur who encouraged Katz not to give up on his research even in the absence of an academic post. Indeed, despite the difficulty of setting aside time for research, Katz succeeded in completing the article mentioned. Its publication in the pages of Zion gave rise to favourable responses, and even won Katz an invitation to the first International Congress of Jewish studies in Jerusalem in 1947. With hindsight it is possible to claim that Katz's article on "Marriage and Sexual Relations" in Zion paved the way for his joining the faculty of Hebrew University. At the approach of the academic year 1949-1950, the University invited Katz to serve as an adjunct instructor, offering him 25% of a full-time post.

Katz became a specialist in Jewish-gentile relations, the Jewish Enlightenment, or Haskalah, anti-Semitism, and the Holocaust. His works in Hebrew provide much of the basis for scholarly analyses of anti-Semitism.

Personal life
Professor Katz, was an Orthodox Jew. He was married to his wife Gerti for 62 years, until his death at age 93 in 1998. They had three sons, (David of Ashkelon, Israel, and Chanan and Uriel, both of Jerusalem). At the time of his death he had 11 grandchildren.

Awards
 In 1980, Katz was awarded the Israel Prize, for "history of the Jewish people.

 In 1974 he became an honorary member of the American Academy of Arts and Sciences.

Published works

 Tradition and Crisis: Jewish Society at the End of the Middle Ages
 From Prejudice to Destruction: Anti-Semitism, 1700-1933
 Exclusiveness and Tolerance: Studies in Jewish-Gentile Relations in Medieval and Modern Times
 The Darker Side of Genius
 Out of the Ghetto: The Social Background of Jewish Emancipation, 1770-1870
 The "Shabbes Goy"
 Divine Law in Human Hands: Case Studies in Halakhic Flexibility
 A House Divided: Orthodoxy and Schism in Nineteenth-Century Central European Jewry

See also
List of Israel Prize recipients

References

External links 
 Brief biography at Jacobkatz.co.il and a bibliography of more than 300 works 

Jewish historians
20th-century Hungarian historians
Historians of the Holocaust
Scholars of antisemitism
Israel Prize in history recipients
Israel Prize in history of the Jewish people recipients
20th-century Hungarian Jews
Israeli people of Hungarian-Jewish descent
People from Veszprém County
1904 births
1998 deaths
20th-century Israeli historians
Hungarian emigrants to Mandatory Palestine